Clevedon was a New Zealand parliamentary electorate from 1987 to 1993 and then from 2002 to 2008. For the first six-year period the electorate was represented by Warren Kyd. For the second six-year period, the electorate was represented by Judith Collins.

Population centres
The 1987 electoral redistribution took the continued population growth in the North Island into account, and two additional general electorates were created, bringing the total number of electorates to 97. In the South Island, the shift of population to Christchurch had continued. Overall, three electorates were newly created  (including Clevedon), three electorates were recreated, and four electorates were abolished. All of those electorates were in the North Island. Changes in the South Island were restricted to boundary changes.

Clevedon took in the urban population centres of Flat Bush, Botany Downs and Dannemora to the west, Beachlands and Maraetai to the north and the sparsely populated Hunua Ranges to the east. Under finalised boundary changes for the 2008 general election, the Clevedon electorate ceased to exist, with its population centres being distributed among the new Botany electorate, a redrawn and renamed electorate of Papakura and the resurrected  electorate.

History
The Clevedon electorate was first created in 1987. Warren Kyd of the National Party was the electorate's first representative. When the electorate was abolished in 1993, Kyd transferred to the Hauraki electorate.

In a rare event for the National Party, an incumbent was successfully challenged by newcomer Judith Collins, with allegations being made that controversial party president Michelle Boag played a part in the decision. Collins won the nomination and the subsequent election.

Members of Parliament

Key

List MPs

Election results

2005 election

2002 election

1990 election

1987 election

Notes

References

External links
Electorate Profile  Parliamentary Library

Historical electorates of New Zealand
1987 establishments in New Zealand
1993 disestablishments in New Zealand
2002 establishments in New Zealand
2008 disestablishments in New Zealand